The Enchanting Shadow is a 1960 Hong Kong drama film directed by Li Han-hsiang. It was entered into the 1960 Cannes Film Festival. The film was also selected as the Hong Kong entry for the Best Foreign Language Film at the 33rd Academy Awards, but was not accepted as a nominee. The film was an inspiration for the 1987 film A Chinese Ghost Story.

Cast
 Betty Loh Ti as Nie Xiaoqian
 Zhao Lei as Ning Caichen
 Yang Chih-ching (Yang Zhiqing) as Yan Chixia
 Tang Ruoqing as Lao Lao
 Lee Kwan as Scholar's servant

See also
 List of submissions to the 33rd Academy Awards for Best Foreign Language Film
 List of Hong Kong submissions for the Academy Award for Best Foreign Language Film

References

External links

The Enchanting Shadow at the Hong Kong Movie Database
The Enchanting Shadow at the Chinese Movie Database

1960 films
1960 drama films
1960s fantasy drama films
1960s Mandarin-language films
Films directed by Li Han-hsiang
Hong Kong fantasy drama films
Shaw Brothers Studio films